Dave Kearney (born 19 June 1989), is an Irish rugby union player who plays wing and fullback for Lansdowne, Leinster and Ireland. He attended Clongowes Wood College.  Kearney's older brother, Rob, formerly started at fullback for Leinster and the Ireland national rugby union team.

Career

Leinster
Kearney played his first match for Leinster on 16 May 2009 against the Newport Dragons entering the match as a substitute.  He scored his first try in a Leinster jersey playing against the Newport Gwent Dragons in December of the 2009–10 season, one of three matches he played that season. In Kearney's third season with Leinster he scored four tries in 13 Celtic League matches during the 2010–11 season. On 12 March 2021 Kearney scored a hat-trick in a win against Zebre in the Pro14, bringing his try tally for Leinster over 50 to 51. Following a strong season in the Championship, Kearney was named to his first Pro14 Dream Team following the 2020–21 campaign.

Ireland
Kearney has 17 caps for the Ireland U-20 team, and 2 caps for Ireland Wolfhounds. In his second match for the Wolfhounds he scored a try against England Saxons on 28 January 2012. Kearney has 19 caps for the senior Ireland team, making his debut against Samoa, when he came on as a substitute and scored two tries. He played in every match in the 2014 Six Nations Championship when Ireland won their 12th Championship title, being one of only 3 players to play the full 80 minutes in every game, along with his brother Rob, and Jamie Heaslip.

Honours

Leinster
European Rugby Champions Cup (3): 2011, 2012, 2018
Pro14 (6): 2013, 2014, 2018, 2019, 2020, 2021
European Challenge Cup (1): 2013

Ireland
Six Nations Championship (1): 2014

Individual
Pro14 Dream Team of the Year (1): 2021

References

External links
ESPN Profile
Leinster Profile
Ireland Profile
Pro14 Profile

1989 births
Living people
Rugby union wings
Leinster Rugby players
Irish rugby union players
People educated at Clongowes Wood College
Ireland international rugby union players
Ireland Wolfhounds international rugby union players
Rugby union players from County Louth
Lansdowne Football Club players